Red Bus Services is an Australian bus company operating route bus services on the New South Wales Central Coast.

History
In 1923 Messrs. Barham & Wells started a bus service between The Entrance and Wyong in opposition to a ferry service. In 1924 a service commenced between The Entrance and Gosford trading as The Red Bus Company - Tuggerah Lakes Motors. The business was sold in 1929 to the Sloman family and renamed The Entrance Red Bus Service. In 1946 a service between Gosford and East Springfield was purchased and renamed Gosford Bus Service.

In 1949, services from The Entrance to Wyong, The Entrance to Ourimbah and Ourimbah to Wyong were purchased. In 1952, local services in The Entrance were purchased giving The Entrance Red Bus Service control of all services operating in the area. In the early 1950s, Red Bus also operated coach services out of Newcastle, Gosford and Cooma and was the first mainland bus company to operate a coach to Tasmania. The Gosford to Kariong and Lisarow services were purchased and later sold. In December 1973, the Gosford to Matcham and Holgate service was acquired.

In June 1988, the Central Coast Airbus between Bateau Bay and Sydney Airport service commenced, ceasing in 2000. The Gosford Bus Service and The Entrance Red Bus Service names remained in use until the late 1990s when both were rebranded as Red Bus Services and all operations consolidated at the Bateau Bay depot.

Since 2008, Red Bus Services have formed Sydney Outer Metropolitan Bus Region 7.

Fleet
As at August 2020, the fleet consisted of 100 buses and coaches. The fleet livery was red and cream until the Transport for NSW white and blue livery was adopted in 2010. The Central Coast Airbus fleet was painted in a grey, white red and yellow scheme.

Services
As of August, 2020 the following services are provided.

15/16: The Entrance or Bateau Bay Square to Tuggerah Train Station (Certain Trips to Wyong) and Return. Monday - Friday Peak Hours.

17/18: The Entrance North or The Entrance to Gosford ( 18 Via Killarney Vale) and Return. 
Monday - Friday Peak Hours.

19: Gosford to Wyong Via Bateau Bay & Killarney Vale  (select services travel to Wyong Hospital).

20: Gosford to Holgate and Matcham and Return.

21/22/23: Gosford Train Station to The Entrance (some services extend to The Entrance North). 
21: Operates Via Bateau Bay East, 22 operates via Old Gosford Road, 23 operates Via Shelly Beach.

24: The Entrance to Wyong via Glenning Valley and return. Limited Service. 3 services to Wyong AM M - F, Late Night Services Mon - Sun.

25: The Entrance to Wyong via Glenning Valley and return.

26: The Entrance to Wyong via Berkeley Vale.

28: Gosford to The Entrance Via Springfield. Late Night Service.

29: Bay Village to Wyong Hospital via The Entrance North and Toukley. Some Journeys Extend to Gosford.

30: Wyong to Westfield Tuggerah Via Tacoma South.

40: Gosford to North Gosford and Return. (Certain Trips Extend to Wyoming Shops)

41: Gosford to West Gosford and Return.

42: Gosford to Point Frederick and Return.

43: Springfield to Gosford. Monday-Friday Peak Hours

44: Gosford to Erina Fair Via Springfield 

45: Bay Village loop service via Mingara Recreation Club.

47: Tuggerah Train Station to Ourimbah Train Station Via Kangy Angy.

48: Bay Village Loop Service via Forresters Beach.

References

Bus companies of New South Wales
Transport companies established in 1923
Transport on the Central Coast (New South Wales)
1923 establishments in Australia